The music of Liechtenstein has produced an internationally renowned composer in Josef Rheinberger (1839–1901), who was mentor to Engelbert Humperdinck and a friend of Franz Liszt.

The national anthem of Liechtenstein is "Oben am jungen Rhein", which was written in 1850 by Jakob Josef Jauch to the tune of "God Save the Queen", the national anthem of the United Kingdom.

One of the most notable singers from Liechtenstein is Al Walser. Other notable acts that have had success outside Liechtenstein are Erben der Schöpfung and Elis.

Music institutions
A popular tourist site, Liechtenstein hosts a number of music festivals, including the Guitar Days, held annually. The rock and metal music festival Wavejam Openair is held annually in Balzers.  Musical organizations include the Liechtenstein Musical Company.  Radio Liechtenstein is the biggest radio station in the country. There are more than 400 music associations in Liechtenstein, including the Liechtenstein Musical Company and the International Josef Gabriel Rheinberger Society.

Music education
The Liechtenstein Music School is the most important music education institution in the country.  It is headquartered in Vaduz, in the home where Josef Rheinberger was born in 1839.  The Liechtenstein Music School also cooperates with public schools in providing music education for younger students.

References